Ciringa is a small dispersed settlement in the Municipality of Kungota in the western part of the Slovene Hills in northeastern Slovenia, right on the border with Austria.

References

External links 
Ciringa on Geopedia

Populated places in the Municipality of Kungota